Alexander Melei Rose (born 17 November 1991) is a Samoan-American athlete, competing primarily in the discus throw and occasionally in the shot put and the hammer throw.   He represented Samoa at the 2016 Olympics, and 2020 Summer Olympics, as well as the Commonwealth Games and Pacific Games.

Life 
Although born in the United States, Rose holds dual citizenship with Samoa, since his father was born there and emigrated to the US as a 19-year-old.  He threw for Central Michigan University.

He represented Samoa in the 2013 World Championships in Athletics and the 2015 World Championships in Athletics, failing to qualify for the final on both occasions. He had success at the Oceania Athletics Championships, with eight gold medals in three different throwing events. At the 2022 World Athletics Championships he came 8th in the world and made the final.

On 14 July 2022 he was selected as part of Samoa's team for the 2022 Commonwealth Games in Birmingham.

His personal best in the discus was 66.91 metres (Claremont, California, 19 July 2019), until he improved his national record to 67.48m at the University of Arizona on 22 May 2021.

Competition record

Personal bests
Outdoor
Shot put – 17.22 (Papeete 2013)
Discus throw – 67.48 (Tucson 2021) NR
Hammer throw – 58.66 (Port Moresby 2015) NR

Indoor
Shot put – 17.75 (Bowling Green 2011)
Weight throw – 19.73 (Chicago 2016) NR

References

 https://athletics.aurora.edu/news/2016/5/18/general-2016-summer-olympics-up-next-for-aus-rose.aspx?path=general

External links
 

Samoan male shot putters
Samoan male discus throwers
1991 births
Living people
People from West Branch, Michigan
American sportspeople of Samoan descent
World Athletics Championships athletes for Samoa
Athletes (track and field) at the 2016 Summer Olympics
Athletes (track and field) at the 2018 Commonwealth Games
Olympic athletes of Samoa
Central Michigan Chippewas men's track and field athletes
Commonwealth Games competitors for Samoa
Athletes (track and field) at the 2020 Summer Olympics
Sportspeople from Michigan